The 2016 Ottawa Fury FC season was the club's third season at the professional level, and its last in the North American Soccer League before its subsequent move to the United Soccer League.

Off-season

Staff
On 20 November 2015, Paul Dalglish was announced as the club's new head coach, replacing Marc Dos Santos who had moved on to a head coaching position with Swope Park Rangers and an assistant coaching position with Sporting Kansas City. On 2 December 2015, the Fury announced that assistant coach Martin Nash and goalkeeping coach Bruce Grobbelaar had been re-signed for the 2016 season. A week later it was announced that technical director Philip Dos Santos had left the club for other opportunities and that former Chelsea academy coach Darko Buser had been promoted to the position.

Roster moves
On 17 November 2015, the club announced it had re-signed 2015 NASL Golden Glove winner Romuald Peiser to a two-year contract. On 14 December, the club announced it had officially released Drew Beckie, Andrew Wiedeman, Tom Heinemann, Uğur Albayrak, Oliver, Nicki Paterson and Aly Hassan, and had picked up contract options for Rafael Alves, Carl Haworth, Marcel DeBellis, Paulo Jr. and had re-signed Brandon Poltronieri. The following day, management announced the transfers of Richie Ryan, Siniša Ubiparipović and Ryan Richter. On 16 December, it was announced that Canadian national team captain Julian de Guzman and Canadian youth international Mauro Eustáquio had re-signed with the club.

On 18 December 2015, the Fury announced their first three new signings of the off-season; Jamaican centre forward Dennis Chin, and two of manager Paul Dalglish's former players from the Austin Aztex, American midfielder Lance Rozeboom and Brazilian defender Fernando Timbó.

On 12 January 2016, the club announced the signing of Northern Irish midfielder Jonny Steele. The same day it was announced that Brazilians Paulo Jr. and Rafael Alves had been re-signed through 2017. The following day, it was announced that Canadian international Kyle Porter had been signed by the club. On 14 January, the club announced the signing of Rich Balchan and recent USL champion Onua Obasi The following day, Ottawa announced the signing of English midfielder James Bailey. In the same press release, it was announced that Irish centre-back Colin Falvey had been purchased by Indy Eleven for an undisclosed fee.

On 18 January, the Fury announced the pre-signing of Argentine midfielder Gerardo Bruna from Football League Two's Accrington Stanley for the end of the 2015–16 English football season. On 2 February, the club announced the signing of two Canadian players, midfielder Mozzi Gyorio and goalkeeper Andrew MacRae. On 4 February, Miami FC purchased defender Mason Trafford from the club through a clause in the player's contract which required the Fury to transfer him if a certain minimum fee was offered. On 11 February, the Fury announced the signing of American centre-back Kyle Venter from the USL's Tulsa Roughnecks.

Season review

February
Pre-season training camp began on Monday, 15 February with indoor training at the Branchaud-Brière Complex in Gatineau. At the start of training camp, it was revealed that Accrington Stanley had released Gerardo Bruna, allowing him to join the Fury in time for pre-season and avoid an overly long playing season.

The Fury played their first pre-season match against the academy team on the 19th, an informal game consisting of two 36-minute halves with different lineups. Supplementing the first-team lineup was American trialist forward Miles Byass, as well as four academy players: Jeff Addai, Dario Conte, Emad Houache and Ndzemdzela "Zoom" Langwa. The primary focus of the match was fitness, and despite multiple good scoring opportunities for the first team, the game ultimately finished in a scoreless draw.

A week later, the club played its first pre-season match against another club, travelling to Toronto to play reserve side Toronto FC II. Ottawa scored first in the match off a penalty drawn by Paulo Jr. in the 30th minute, with new arrival Gerardo Bruna converting the spot kick. At the half, Dalglish substituted all outfield players. In the 60th minute, keeper Romuald Peiser was substituted in favour of Andrew MacRae. The Fury lost their lead in the 85th minute as Sal Bernal drew TFC level. In the final minutes of the match, centre forward Dennis Chin sealed the win with a spectacular diving header off a cross by trialist Miles Byass. In addition to Byass, the Fury fielded Academy fullback Zoom Langwa in place of Onua Obasi who had not yet arrived at camp. Goalkeeper Marcel DeBellis was also rested for the match due to a knock. The club then travelled to Casa Grande, Arizona for outdoor training and two friendlies the following week.

March
In the afternoon of 2 March, prior to a friendly against Indy Eleven, the club announced the acquisition of Brazilian forward Pablo Dyego on a season-long loan from Fluminense and of Canadian international Marcel de Jong on a permanent deal. Both new signings appeared as substitutes in the second half of the match. The first half began quietly and ultimately ended 0–0 with each team having one scoring chance. At the half, Ottawa changed all its players but Rafael Alves. In the 63rd minute, the game broke open as the recently signed Pablo Dyego supplied a cross to compatriot Paulo Jr. who scored the match's opening goal. Three minutes later, Dyego added his own with a volley which caught Indy keeper Keith Cardona off his line to make it 2–0. In the 74th minute Paulo Jr. was fouled in the box, resulting in a penalty which was converted for the second match in a row by Gerardo Bruna. This scoreline would hold, but not before Pablo Dyego was forced off due to a knock after colliding with the opposing keeper. Academy player Zoom Langwa again made a start in place of Onua Obasi and Jeff Addai also appeared later in the match as a substitute for Alves.

The Fury concluded their trip to Arizona with a dominating 4–0 win over Real Salt Lake's locally based academy team. Paulo Jr. again opened the scoring for Ottawa off a pass from Fernando Timbó in the first half. This scoreline held until halftime, when all of the Fury players other than Carl Haworth were substituted. Early in the second half, Dennis Chin added to the lead after finishing a cross from Mozzi Gyorio. Chin then set up a goal by Carl Haworth, his first of the pre-season. Haworth then returned the favour, feeding Chin for the match's fourth and final goal. Striker Pablo Dyego did not appear in the match, possibly the result of the injury he sustained towards the end of the previous friendly against Indy Eleven. Academy players Jeff Addai and Zoom Langwa again appeared for the first team.

On 10 March, the Fury played a friendly against USL neighbours Rochester Rhinos. The match consisted of four 30-minute quarters, totaling 120 minutes. In the second quarter, Paulo Jr. converted a penalty to give Ottawa a 1–0 lead. Shortly afterwards, Rochester scored to bring the teams level going into half-time. At the break, Ottawa substituted all its players save Lance Rozeboom. The third quarter went poorly for the Fury as the Rhinos added another two goals to go up 3–1. Goalkeeper Andrew MacRae then made a save on a penalty to keep the deficit at two. In the fourth quarter Mozzi Gyorio clawed one back for Ottawa off a pass by fellow Canadian Carl Haworth. Academy player Jeff Addai then supplied a cross to Gerardo Bruna, who finished late in the game to seal a draw.

One week after the Rhinos friendly, the club issued a press release stating that Pablo Dyego and Kyle Venter had suffered knee injuries that were expected to sideline the players for six to eight months each (expected to return September–November).

The club finished its pre-season slate with a 3–1 win over FC Montreal on 19 March. James Bailey scored his first goal of pre-season inside the opening 5 minutes to give the Fury the lead, however recent Fury loanee Jérémy Gagnon-Laparé clawed one back for Montreal in the 29th minute to finish the half 1–1. Carl Haworth then proceeded to secure the win for Ottawa with a brace in the 57th and 87th minutes.

On 25 March, the Fury announced the signing of Israeli winger Idan Vered. The following day, it was revealed that Brandon Poltronieri had left the club.

April
Ottawa opened its league season with a match in New York City against the Cosmos in a rematch of last season's Soccer Bowl. Despite strong spells of possession, the Fury had multiple defensive errors punished by the defending champions, who came away 3–0 winners.

On 7 April the club announced it had signed Uruguayan midfielder Bryan Olivera on loan from Fluminense for the season.

Squad

Transfers

In

Out

Trial

Friendlies

Pre-season

Friendly statistics

1 Academy player.

2 Trialist.

Competitions

NASL Spring Season

Standings

Results summary

Results by round

Match reports

NASL Fall season

Standings

Results summary

Results by round

Match reports

NASL Combined Season

Standings

Results summary

Results by round

Canadian Championship

Preliminary round

Semi-finals

Squad statistics

Appearances and goals

|-

|-

|-

|-

|-

|-

|-

|-

|-

|-

|-

|-

|-

|-

|-

|-

|-

|-

|-

|-

|-

|-

|-

|-
|colspan="14"|Players who appeared for Ottawa but left during the season:
|-

|-

|-

|-

|-

|}

Goal scorers

Disciplinary

Awards

Player

References

Ottawa Fury
Ottawa Fury
2016
Ottawa Fury
2010s in Ottawa